"Pimped Out" is the second single from Brooke Valentine's second album, Physical Education. It features American southern rap group Dem Franchize Boyz. The single was released in 2006 and peaked at #87 on the Billboard Hot R&B/Hip-Hop Songs chart.

In 2007, it had been announced that the album had been shelved. A mixtape titled Physical Education: The Mixtape was released in April 2009, and it featured the track.

The song was mixed by Kevin "KD" Davis.

Track listing
12" vinyl
Side A'
"Pimped Out" (Radio Edit) - 4:17  
"Pimped Out" (Radio Edit (No Rap) - 3:28  
"Pimped Out" (Album version - Edited) - 4:40 Side B 
"Pimped Out" (Album version - Explicit) - 4:40  
"Pimped Out" (Instrumental) - 4:39  
"Pimped Out" (A Cappella - Explicit With Rap) - 4:36

CD single
"Pimped Out"    
"Pimped Out" (Radio edit)   
"Pimped Out" (Edited Album version)   
"Pimped Out" (Instrumental)

Charts

Personnel
Credits for Pimped Out'' adapted from Allmusic.

 Composers: James "Chip" Bunton, Erica Dymakkus, Bernard "Jizzal Man" Leverette, Brooke Valentine, Jamall "Pimpin" Willingham - Composer  
 Producer: C. Carroll Cole
 Mixer: Kevin KD Davis
 Primary Artist: Brooke Valentine, Dem Franchize Boyz

References

2006 singles
2006 songs
Brooke Valentine songs
Dem Franchize Boyz songs